Copiapoa atacamensis is a species of cactus from the Atacama Desert in the province of Antofagasta in northern Chile. Its relationship with other species of Copiapoa, such as C. calderana, are unclear .

Description
Copiapoa atacamensis is a globose cactus, either solitary or clump-forming. The overall appearance is very spiny. They are followed by green to rose coloured fruits.

Growing in the Atacama Desert, one of the driest places in the world, it has a taproot which is considerably longer than the stem and which it uses for storing water.

Systematics
Copiapoa atacamensis was named by Harry Middleditch in 1980. The relationships among some of the species of Copiapoa are unclear . C. atacamensis has been treated as a subspecies of C. calderana under the name C. calderana subsp. atacamensis; alternatively C. calderana may be reduced to the variety calderana of C. atacamensis. Copiapoa boliviana is given as a synonym of C. atacamensis by some sources; others consider this name to be unresolved or to be a synonym of C. echinoides.

References

Cacti of South America
Endemic flora of Chile
Flora of northern Chile
Atacama Desert
Plants described in 1980
Cactoideae